Pijavice is a small settlement in the Mirna Valley in southeastern Slovenia. The village lies southwest of Krmelj along the railway from Sevnica to Trebnje and the left bank of the Mirna River. Traditionally, it is part of Lower Carniola. Administratively, it is part of the Municipality of Sevnica. The municipality is included in the Lower Sava Statistical Region. The rail line from Sevnica to Trebnje runs through the settlement and has a station there.

References

External links

Pijavice at Geopedia

Populated places in the Municipality of Sevnica